The following are the national records in athletics by Taiwan, competing as Chinese Taipei, maintained by Taiwan's national athletics federation: Chinese Taipei Athletics Association (CTAA).

Outdoor
Key to tables:
  

+ = en route to a longer distance

h = hand timing

A = affected by altitude

NWI = no wind information

Men

Women

Indoor

Men

Women

Notes

References
General
Taiwanese Outdoor Records 9 March 2021 updated
Specific

External links
CTAA official website

Taiwan
Records
Athletics
Athletics